is a Japanese football player who plays for Gainare Tottori.

Club statistics
As of 22 February 2018.

References

External links

Profile at Cerezo Osaka
Profile at Gainare Tottori

1982 births
Living people
Sapporo University alumni
Association football people from Hokkaido
Sportspeople from Sapporo
Japanese footballers
J1 League players
J2 League players
J3 League players
Albirex Niigata players
Omiya Ardija players
Cerezo Osaka players
Cerezo Osaka U-23 players
Yokohama FC players
Gainare Tottori players
Association football goalkeepers